Roberto Occhipinti (born March 25, 1955) is a Canadian jazz bassist and composer. He is most noted as a two-time Juno Award nominee for Contemporary Jazz Album of the Year, receiving nominations at the Juno Awards of 2006 for his album Yemaya and at the Juno Awards of 2009 for A Bend in the River.

Early life and education 
Occhipinti was born and raised in Toronto. He studied music at the University of Toronto, where he was mentored by Joel Quarrington and Dave Young.

Career 
Occhipinti is a frequent collaborator with his younger brother Michael Occhipinti, in the Neufeld-Occhipinti Jazz Orchestra and Creation Dream. Their cousin David Occhipinti is also a Juno-nominated jazz musician.

One of relatively few Canadian musicians who have had notable success in both jazz and classical music, he has also frequently performed as a member of the Winnipeg Symphony Orchestra, the Hamilton Symphony Orchestra and the Canadian Opera Company.

References

External links
 Website

1955 births
20th-century Canadian male musicians
21st-century Canadian male musicians
Canadian jazz bass guitarists
Canadian jazz composers
Canadian classical musicians
Canadian people of Sicilian descent
Musicians from Toronto
Living people